The 2014 European Aquatics Championships took place from 13 to 24 August 2014 in Berlin, Germany. It was the 31st edition of the championships, and was held in a temporary facility placed in the centre of the Berlin Velodrome. Great Britain headed the medal table on gold medals and total medals, by some distance their best ever performance at the championships. In addition, two world records fell to Great Britain; the 4 x 100 metre mixed medley relay to Adam Peaty, Jemma Lowe, Chris Walker-Hebborn and Fran Halsall, and the men's 50 metre breaststroke to Adam Peaty.

Schedule
Competition dates by discipline were:

 Swimming: 18–24 August
 Diving: 18–24 August
 Open water swimming: 13–17 August
 Synchro: 13–17 August

Medal table

Swimming

Results
42 events: 20 for each sex and 2 mixed. Two gold and one bronze were shared.

Men's events

 Swimmers who participated in the heats only and received medals.

Women's events

 Swimmers who participated in the heats only and received medals.

Mixed events

 Swimmers who participated in the heats only and received medals.

Swimming medal table

Diving

Results

Men's events

Women's events

Team event

Diving medal table

Open water swimming

Results

Men's events

Women's events

Team event

Open water medal table

Synchronised swimming

Results

Synchronised swimming medal table

See also
 2013 World Aquatics Championships
 2015 World Aquatics Championships

References

External links
 Official website
 Results book – Swimming
 Results book – Diving
 Results book – Open water
 Results book – Synchronised swimming

 
LEN European Aquatics Championships
European Aquatics Championships
European Aquatics Championships
2014 European Aquatics Championships
2014
2014 |European Aquatics Championships
European Aquatics Championships
August 2014 sports events in Germany